Ramachandrapura (Hosanagar - Shivamogga) is a small village and neighbourhood located in the outskirts of India's fifth-largest metropolitan area, Bangalore. It is accessible through Doddabommasandra and Jalahalli and Main Ramachandrapura Mutt was located in Hosanagar Shivamogga Dist. Many Indian cattle are present and they nursed well. Google Maps [[13.8652734, 75.0757448 ]].Ramachandrapura Karnataka 577418  https://www.google.com/maps/place/Ramachandrapura,+Karnataka+577418/@13.8701551,75.0794001,13z/data=!4m2!3m1!1s0x3bbb83cb6f51aaab:0x3234a01eb72ffed[[https://maps.app.goo.gl/YmDW9wQBV2wRPnPY6]]

Neighbourhoods in Bangalore